Amitraj Sawant is a Marathi Music Director. He is a  music director-composer and singer from Mumbai.  After Duniyadari his career took higher graph in Marathi film industry. In 2014 he won IMFFA (International Marathi Film Festival Award) for all 3 categories in music section for the movie 72 Miles - Ek Pravas.

Discography

Films

References

External links

Musicians from Mumbai
Indian male composers
Indian male singers
Marathi people
Year of birth missing (living people)
Living people